Narendra Pragji Nathwani (3 January 1913 – 1 September 1993) was an Indian politician. He was elected to the Lok Sabha, the lower house of the Parliament of India from Junagadh, Gujarat.

Nathwani died in Bombay on 1 September 1993, at the age of 80.

References

External links
Official biographical sketch in Parliament of India website

1913 births
1993 deaths
India MPs 1952–1957
India MPs 1957–1962
India MPs 1977–1979
Indian National Congress politicians
Lok Sabha members from Gujarat
Ugandan emigrants to India